Rajanpur railway station is located in Rajanpur, Punjab, Pakistan.

See also
 List of railway stations in Pakistan
 Pakistan Railways

References

External links

Railway stations in Rajanpur District
Railway stations on Kotri–Attock Railway Line (ML 2)